Hervé Blanc (29 January 1955 – 16 August 2020) was a French actor.

Filmography

Feature films
A Week's Vacation (1980)
L'Été ardent (1982)
L'émir préfère les blondes (1983)
Un fils (2003)
Ceci est mon corps (2014)

Medium Length
Les enfants de Pinocchio (2009)

Short films
John (1992)
Au Petit Bonheur (1992)
Visiteur du soir, espoir (1993)
Palais Royal (1994)
Le paradis des infidèles (2001)
Territoire interdit (2005)
Terminus Nord (2007)
Printemps talons aiguilles (2008)
Les quatres colonnes (2009)

Television
Souris Noire (1988)
Crimes et Jardins (1991)
Anne Le Guen : Madame la Conseillère (1995)
L'Institut (2000)
Lettres d'Algérie (2001)

References

1955 births
2020 deaths
French actors
Male actors from Lyon